The Sioux Falls Metropolitan Statistical Area, as defined by the United States Census Bureau, is an area consisting of four counties in South Dakota, anchored by the city of Sioux Falls. The metro area is referred to locally as the Sioux Empire. Despite the name, it is considered a part of the larger area known as Siouxland as it is within the Big Sioux River basin. As of the 2020 census, the MSA had a population of 276,730.

Counties
Lincoln (population: 65,161)
McCook (population: 5,682)
Minnehaha (population: 197,214)
Turner (population: 8,673)

Communities

Places with more than 150,000 inhabitants
Sioux Falls (Principal city)

Places with 1,000 to 15,000 inhabitants
Beresford (partial)
Brandon
Canton
Crooks
Dell Rapids
Garretson
Harrisburg
Hartford
Lennox
Parker
Salem
Tea
Worthing

Places with 500 to 1,000 inhabitants
Baltic
Bridgewater
Canistota
Centerville
Colton
Humboldt
Marion
Valley Springs
Viborg

Places with fewer than 500 inhabitants
Chancellor
Davis
Dolton
Fairview
Hudson
Hurley
Irene (partial)
Monroe
Montrose
Sherman
Spencer

Unincorporated places
Benclare
Booge
Corson
Ellis
Hooker
Lyons
Moe
Morefield
Naomi
Renner
Rowena
Shindler 
Unityville

Demographics
As of the census of 2000, there were 187,093 people, 72,492 households, and 48,282 families residing within the MSA. The racial makeup of the MSA was 94.07% White, 1.25% African American, 1.56% Native American, 0.87% Asian, 0.04% Pacific Islander, 0.87% from other races, and 1.33% from two or more races. Hispanic or Latino of any race were 1.84% of the population.

The median income for a household in the MSA was $40,590, and the median income for a family was $48,191. Males had a median income of $30,994 versus $22,493 for females. The per capita income for the MSA was $19,184.

See also
South Dakota census statistical areas

References

 
Geography of Minnehaha County, South Dakota
Geography of Lincoln County, South Dakota
Geography of Turner County, South Dakota
Geography of McCook County, South Dakota